Murdoch is both a given name and a surname.

Murdoch may also refer to:

Murdoch, Western Australia, a suburb of Perth, Australia
Electoral district of Murdoch, Australia
Murdoch University, Australia
Murdoch, Ohio, United States
9138 Murdoch, a main-belt asteroid

See also
Murdoch Mysteries, a Canadian television drama series